New Danville is an unincorporated community located in Pequea Township in Lancaster County, Pennsylvania.

References

Unincorporated communities in Lancaster County, Pennsylvania
Unincorporated communities in Pennsylvania